Alstrom syndrome 1 also known as ALMS1 is a protein which in humans is encoded by the ALMS1 gene.

Molecular biology 

The gene is located on the short arm of chromosome 2 (2p13.2) on the plus (Watson) strand. It is 224,161 bases in length organised into 23 exons. The encoded protein has 4,167 amino acids and molecular weight of 460,937 Da. Three isoforms are known. The protein itself has a large tandem-repeat domain comprising 34 imperfect repetitions of 47 amino acids. Mutations associated with disease are usually found in exons 8, 10 and 16.

The gene is expressed in fetal tissues including the aorta, brain, eye, kidney, liver, lung, olfactory bulb, pancreas, skeletal muscle, spleen and testis. The protein is found in the cytoplasm, centrosome, cell projections and cilium basal body. During mitosis it localizes to both spindle poles.

Function 

Knockdown of Alms1 by short interfering RNA in mouse inner medullary collecting duct cells caused defective ciliogenesis. Cilia were stunted and treated cells lacked the ability to increase calcium influx in response to mechanical stimuli.

Disease association

Mutations in the ALMS1 gene have been found to be causative for Alström syndrome with a total of 81 disease-causing mutations.

Multiple mutations are known: the current (2007) total is 79. These include both nonsense and frameshift mutations. Most of the mutations have been found in exons 8,10 and 16.

Discovery 

The Jackson Laboratory in Bar Harbor, Maine, USA with the University of Southampton, UK isolated ALMS1 as the single gene responsible for Alström syndrome.

See also 
Alms1, centrosome and basal body associated protein

References

External links
  GeneReviews/NCBI/NIH/UW entry on Alstrom syndrome
  OMIM entries on Alström syndrome